Satu (Indonesian: "One") is a 2015 album by the bands Noah, Nidji, Geisha &  d'Masiv. It is the biggest album project from Iwan Fals with. This album contains criticism about the haters and a little romance. This album when it was released on iTunes immediately placed the third chart. Steve Lilywhite not only as a producer but join to composed "ABADI" with the various musician songwriters.

Singles

Track listing

References 

2015 albums